The 326th Engineer Battalion (Sapper Eagles) is one of three air assault engineer battalions in the United States Army.  The 326th is part of the 1st Infantry Brigade Combat Team ("Bastogne")(♣), 101st Airborne Division and has been a part of the 101st since World War I.

Lineage
The 326th Engineer Battalion's lineage of record:
 Constituted 23 July 1918 in the National Army as the 326th Engineers and assigned to the 101st Division
 Reconstituted 24 June 1921 in the Organized Reserves as the 326th Engineers and assigned to the 101st Division
 Organized in November 1921 at Milwaukee, Wisconsin
 Regiment broken up 31 March 1942 and its elements reorganized as the 326th Engineer Battalion and remained assigned to the 101st Division
 326th Engineer Battalion withdrawn 15 August 1942 from the Organized Reserves and allotted to the Army of the United States; concurrently redesigned as the 326th Airborne Engineer Battalion and activated at Camp Claiborne, Louisiana
 Inactivated 30 November 1945 in France
 Consolidated 18 June 1948 with the 49th Engineer Combat Battalion and consolidated unit redesigned as the 49th Airborne Engineer Battalion, an element of the 101st Airborne Division
 Allotted 25 June 1948 to the Regular Army
 Activated 6 July 1948 at Camp Breckinridge, Kentucky
 Inactivated 29 April 1949 at Camp Breckinridge, Kentucky
 Activated 25 August 1950 at Camp Breckinridge, Kentucky
 Inactivated 1 December 1953 at Camp Breckinridge, Kentucky
 Activated 15 May 1954 at Fort Jackson, South Carolina
 Redesignated 1 July 1956 as the 326th Airborne Engineer Battalion
 Redesignated 25 April 1957 as the 326th Engineer Battalion
 Inactivated 15 September 2004 at Fort Campbell, Kentucky, and relieved from assignment to the 101st Airborne Division Headquarters and Headquarters Company activated 19 October 2006 at Fort Campbell, Kentucky
 Assigned 17 April 2014 to the 1st Infantry Brigade Combat Team, 101st Airborne Division

Decorations
The 326th Engineer Battalion's decorations of record:
 Presidential Unit Citation (Army), Streamer embroidered NORMANDY
 Presidential Unit Citation (Army), Streamer embroidered BASTOGNE
 Meritorious Unit Commendation (Army), Streamer embroidered SOUTHWEST ASIA 1990-1991
 Meritorious Unit Commendation (Army), Streamer embroidered IRAQ 2003-2004
 Meritorious Unit Commendation (Army), Streamer embroidered IRAQ 2007-2008
 Meritorious Unit Commendation (Army), Streamer embroidered SOUTHWEST ASIA 2011
 Army Superior Unit Award, Streamer embroidered 2001
 French Croix de Guerre with Palm, World War II, Streamer embroidered NORMANDY
 Netherlands Orange Lanyard
 Belgian Croix de Guerre 1940 with Palm, Streamer embroidered BASTOGNE; Cited in the Order of the Day of the Belgian Army for action at Bastogne
 Belgian Fourragere 1940
 Cited in the Order of the Day of the Belgian Army for action in France and Belgium
 Republic of Vietnam Cross of Gallantry with Palm, Streamer embroidered VIETNAM 1968-1969
 Republic of Vietnam Cross of Gallantry with Palm, Streamer embroidered VIETNAM 1971
 Republic of Vietnam Civil Action Honor Medal, First Class, Streamer embroidered VIETNAM 1968-1970
Company A additional entitled to:
 Presidential Unit Citation (Army), Streamer embroidered DAK TO
 Valorous Unit Award, Streamer embroidered TUY HOA
 Meritorious Unit Commendation (Army), Streamer embroidered VIETNAM 1966
 Republic of Vietnam Cross of Gallantry with Palm, Streamer embroidered VIETNAM 1966-1967
Company B additionally entitled to:
 Valorous Unit Award, Streamer embroidered THUA THIEN PROVINCE
 Meritorious Unit Commendation (Army), Streamer embroidered VIETNAM 1968
Company C additionally entitled to:
 Republic of Vietnam Cross of Gallantry with Palm, Streamer embroidered VIETNAM 1968

References

101st Airborne Division
Engineer battalions of the United States Army